USS Don was a captured British steam-operated cargo ship acquired by the Union Navy from the prize court during the American Civil War.

She was put into service by the Union Navy to patrol navigable waterways of the Confederacy to prevent the South from trading with other countries.

Service history
She was purchased by the Navy Department and sent to Boston Navy Yard to be fitted for service, arriving on 21 April 1864. Don put out from Boston on 15 May 1864, under the command of Acting Master S. B. Gregory, to join the Potomac Flotilla. She patrolled the Potomac River and other waters in and bordering Virginia with her base at Washington Navy Yard until 26 September 1865, when she sailed for New York City. Don remained at New York until 28 October, when she joined the North Atlantic Blockade Squadron to cruise on the coasts of the Atlantic and Gulf of Mexico, and in the West Indies. She returned to New York on 11 May 1868, was decommissioned there on 18 May 1868, and sold on 29 August.

References

Ships of the Union Navy
Steamships of the United States Navy
American Civil War auxiliary ships of the United States